Gary Berkowitz is an American radio broadcast consultant based in Detroit, Michigan.

Bio 
Originally from Oceanside, New York, he attended Emerson College in Boston, Massachusetts where he received a bachelor's degree in Speech and Communications.

Berkowitz is noted for being an original innovator of contemporary FM radio, and popularizing the Top 40 category in the 1970s and 1980s. Gary was the originator and first program director of WPRO-FM (92 PRO-FM) in Providence. Berkowitz went on to program leading US radio stations such as WPRO (AM), WROR–Boston, WHYT–Detroit, WJR–Detroit and WKQI–Detroit.

Berkowitz is the president of Berkowitz Broadcast Consulting. Affiliated with hundreds of radio companies over the years including CBS Radio, ABC, Greater Media, Americom Broadcasting and many other leading private and public broadcast groups.

In 2007, Berkowitz was on the CBS Radio team that debuted Fresh 102.7 (WWFS) in New York. Berkowitz specializes in adult contemporary and classic hits radio stations.

In May 2009, Berkowitz, along with partner Jon Wolfert of Jam Productions in Dallas formed 1330 Networks, LLC to produce and syndicate radio programs.

In 2012, Berkowitz was inducted into the Rhode Island Radio Hall of Fame for his work over the years at WPRO and 92 PRO-FM.

In 2013, Berkowitz was inducted into the WERS, Boston (Emerson College) Hall of Fame.

External links 
 Berkowitz Broadcast Consulting Website

Living people
20th-century American businesspeople
1951 births